Badar Mubarak Saleh Al-Maimani (born 16 July 1984), commonly known as Badar Al-Maimani, is an Omani football manager and a former footballer who is the current second assistant manager of Fanja SC in Oman Professional League.

Club career statistics

International career

Badar was selected for the national team for the first time in 2003, along with Ahmed Mubarak, Ahmed Hadid and Ali Al-Habsi.

Arabian Gulf Cup
Badar has made appearances in the 16th Arabian Gulf Cup, the 17th Arabian Gulf Cup, the 18th Arabian Gulf Cup and the 19th Arabian Gulf Cup.

He first showed his talent during the 16th Arabian Gulf Cup in 2003–04, scoring a goal in a 2-0 over Qatar. In the tournament, Oman finished at the fourth place, hence reaching its best ever position in the Arabian Gulf Cup competition, reaching the final four round for the first time, with eight points from two wins and two draws.

In the 17th Arabian Gulf Cup in 2004, Badar scored a total of three goals, one in a 2-1 win over the United Arab Emirates, other in a 3-2 win over Bahrain and another in a 1-1 draw against hosts Qatar in the final of tournament hence helping his country to reach the semi-finals and then the finals of the Arabian Gulf Cup for the first time. But Oman lost in the final to the hosts, Qatar in a penalty shootout after the goalkeeping sensation Ali Al-Habsi missed a penalty. Qatar won the match 6-5 on penalties after the match had ended 1-1 at normal time. Amad Al-Hosni was awarded the "Top Goal Scorer" award of the competition with a total of four goals.

He scored one goal in the 18th Arabian Gulf Cup in 2007, in a 1-0 win over Bahrain. This was the second time when Oman reached to the finals but again they lost to the hosts, the United Arab Emirates. Ismail Matar, the Emirati legend, scored the lone goal of the match as United Arab Emirates won their first ever Arabian Gulf Cup.

Finally in 2009, he helped his team to win their first ever Arabian Gulf Cup trophy. He scored one goal in the 19th Arabian Gulf Cup in a 2-0 win over Bahrain hence increasing his tally to three goals against Bahrain.

AFC Asian Cup
Badar has made appearances in the 2004 AFC Asian Cup qualification, the 2004 AFC Asian Cup, the 2007 AFC Asian Cup qualification, the 2007 AFC Asian Cup and the 2011 AFC Asian Cup qualification.

He scored two goals in the 2004 AFC Asian Cup qualification, one in a 7-0 win over Nepal and another in a 6-0 win over Vietnam hence helping his team to qualify for the 2004 AFC Asian Cup. In the tournament, Oman won four points in a 2-0 win over Thailand and a 2-2 draw against Iran and hence failed to qualify for the quarter-finals.

In the 2007 AFC Asian Cup qualification, he scored a brace in a 4-1 win over Pakistan in the group stage and again helped his team to qualify for the 2007 AFC Asian Cup. He scored one and the only goal of Oman in the 2007 AFC Asian Cup in a 1-1 draw against Australia. In the tournament, Oman won two points in two points in a 1-1 draw against Australia and in a 0-0 draw against Iraq and hence failed to qualify for the quarter-finals.

In the 2011 AFC Asian Cup qualification, he played in two matches but failed to score a single goal. Oman failed to qualify for the 2011 AFC Asian Cup.

FIFA World Cup qualification
Badar has made five appearances in the 2014 FIFA World Cup qualification and two in the 2010 FIFA World Cup qualification.

He scored two goals in the 2006 FIFA World Cup qualification including a brace in the Second Round of FIFA World Cup qualification in a 5-1 win over India.

National team career statistics

Goals for senior national team

References

External links
 
 
 Bader Al Maimani at Goal.com
 
 

1984 births
Living people
Omani footballers
Oman international footballers
Omani expatriate footballers
2004 AFC Asian Cup players
2007 AFC Asian Cup players
Muscat Club players
Al-Riyadh SC players
Al Ahli SC (Doha) players
Al-Sailiya SC players
Ettifaq FC players
Fanja SC players
Saudi Professional League players
Qatar Stars League players
Oman Professional League players
Expatriate footballers in Saudi Arabia
Omani expatriate sportspeople in Saudi Arabia
Expatriate footballers in Qatar
Omani expatriate sportspeople in Qatar
Omani football managers
Footballers at the 2006 Asian Games
Association football midfielders
Asian Games competitors for Oman
People from Al Batinah South Governorate